The Bhutanese Royal Court of Justice (Dzongkha: དཔལ་ལྡན་འབྲུག་པའི་དྲང་ཁྲིམས་ལྷན་སྡེ་; Wylie Dpal-ldan 'Brug-pai Drang-khrims Lhan-sde; Palden Drukpa Drangkhrim Lhende) is the government body which oversees the judicial system of Bhutan. Senior Judges of the courts are appointed by the monarch. Bhutan's legal system is influenced by English common law. The Royal Court of Justice is based in the capital Thimphu.

Background
The Bhutanese justice system has always suffered from a lack of qualified officers with most of the office-holders being civil servants. Until the passing of the National Judicial Service Act of 2007, Judges were still a part of the Bhutanese civil service.

Codification in 2008 constitution
In 2008, the Constitution of Bhutan codified the substantive and procedural framework of the Royal Court of Justice. Article 21 of the Constitution establishes a system of royal appointments for the High Court and Supreme Court, and sets forth the role of each level of administration.

The Chief Justice, an appointee of the King, sits for a five-year term and chairs the National Judicial Commission, a royal agency. (Art. 21, §§ 4, 6, 17) The Chief Justice is to participate in several extrajudicial functions, including the Recency Council; presiding over joint sessions of the Parliament of Bhutan for abdication procedures; and presiding over political impeachment proceedings. (Art. 2, §§ 8, 23; Art. 32, § 3)

All Constitutionally appointed judges other than the Chief Justice serve ten-year terms. (Art. 21, §§ 6, 13) There is, however, a mandatory retirement at age 65 for all Judges of the Supreme Court. (Art. 21, § 6) The Chief Justice and the Drangpons of the High Court serve ten-year terms, or until mandatory retirement at age 60. (Art. 21, § 13) No Constitutionally appointed judge may be re-appointed. (Art. 31, § 4)

Structure
 The Supreme Court of Bhutan - highest appellate court in Bhutan, authority on interpretation of laws
 The High Court of Bhutan - appellate and extraterritorial jurisdiction
 Administrative Tribunals established by Parliament
 The Dzongkhag Court - District courts (20)
 The Dungkhag Court - Sub-District courts (13 total in 6 Districts)

See also
Supreme Court of Bhutan
High Court of Bhutan
Dzongkhag Court
Dungkhag Court
Districts of Bhutan
Constitution of Bhutan
Politics of Bhutan
Judicial system of Bhutan
Judiciary

Notes

References

External links

Judiciary of Bhutan
Bhutan
Courts in Bhutan